A SCSI host adapter is a device used to connect one or more other SCSI devices to a computer bus. It is commonly called a SCSI controller, which is not strictly correct as any component understanding the SCSI protocol can be called a controller.  In this sense all SCSI devices have a SCSI controller built into them, while host adapters (unlike, for example, a hard disk or CD-ROM) bear responsibility for transferring data between the SCSI bus and the computer's input/output bus. SCSI adapters serve as a worthy adapter for FireWire Ports.

Most modern SCSI host adapters are PCI cards, either 32-bit or 64-bit. Older ones were based on the 16-bit ISA bus or the transitional 32-bit VESA and EISA buses.  It is not uncommon for a SCSI host adapter to be built into a PC motherboard as an integral part, however this typically makes the board quite expensive and it is more usual to retain the SCSI host adapter as a separate component which can be easily replaced or transferred to another machine.

Types
SCSI host adapters traditionally fall into two broad classes:

 Simple, relatively low-performance cards that provide an inexpensive way to connect SCSI devices that do not demand a great deal of bandwidth: notably CD-ROM drives and SCSI scanners. The cost varies but is typically in the order of $US40 or so. These were very common up until about 2000, but are now fairly rare: the demise of the ISA slot added a little to the cost; the great improvement in IDE technology (particularly in the case of CD-ROM drives and CD recorders) removed one major use, and the advent of USB made the expense of a SCSI interface unnecessary for most scanners.
 High-end cards designed for maximum performance, usually for very high-speed hard drives, and especially for situations that require several high-speed drives (notably servers). These are almost always quite expensive, around $US200 or more. The advent of serial ATA is expected to reduce the usage of high-end SCSI host adapters, but there is no current expectation that they will disappear in the near future.

Manufacturers
Many companies have manufactured SCSI host adapters at one time or another, but the market structure has been remarkably stable over the years. Two leading manufacturers are Adaptec and LSI Logic.

SCSI

de:SCSI-Hostadapter